The William Allen White Cabins are chiefly associated with newspaper editor William Allen White, who adopted what would become  Rocky Mountain National Park as his summer residence from 1912 to his death in 1944. White had visited Estes Park, Colorado while in college, and had previously summered in Colorado Springs. In 1912, White and his wife Sallie purchased an 1887 cabin near Estes Park. The Whites expanded it the next year and built a privy, studio, and two guest cabins.

Visitors to the White place included Clarence Darrow, William Jennings Bryan, Nobel Peace Prize winner Jane Addams and U.S. presidential candidate and Chief Justice Charles Evans Hughes. After William White's death in 1944 the compound remained in the family until 1972, when the property was purchased by the National Park Service. The property was the first nomination to the National Register of Historic Places from Rocky Mountain National Park. The house was rehabilitated in 1976 for use by artists-in-residence.

See also
National Register of Historic Places listings in Larimer County, Colorado

References

External links

National Register of Historic Places in Rocky Mountain National Park
Houses in Larimer County, Colorado
Estes Park, Colorado
Historic districts on the National Register of Historic Places in Colorado
Houses on the National Register of Historic Places in Colorado
Historic American Buildings Survey in Colorado
National Register of Historic Places in Larimer County, Colorado